Dyson Lovell (born 28 August 1936) is a British film producer and actor. He produced amongst others, Franco Zeffirelli's Hamlet, starring Mel Gibson (1990), and Francis Ford Coppola's 1984 box-office flop The Cotton Club, starring Richard Gere and Diane Lane. He has received four Emmy Award, and three Golden Globe nominations for his work as a producer in television.

Lovell originally trained as an actor at RADA, and his early stage work included appearances at The Old Vic and small roles on Broadway. He has played supporting roles in such films as Franco Zeffirelli's 1968 version of Romeo and Juliet, in which he played Sampson.

Productions 

Hamlet
Endless Love
Merlin
Arabian Nights
Jane Eyre
The Odyssey
Alice in Wonderland
A Christmas Carol
Cleopatra
The Lion in Winter

References

External links

1936 births
British film producers
British male stage actors
British male film actors
British male television actors
British television producers
Alumni of RADA
Living people